Nayeli Isela Díaz Díaz (born 10 October 2001) is a Mexican footballer who plays as a forward for American college team Saint Mary's Gaels and the Mexico women's national team.

Early life
Díaz was born in Mexico City and raised in Hacienda Heights, California, United States.

High school and college career
Díaz has attended the Bishop Amat Memorial High School in La Puente, California and the Saint Mary's College of California in Moraga.

International career
Díaz represented Mexico at the 2018 CONCACAF Women's U-17 Championship, the 2018 FIFA U-17 Women's World Cup, the 2019 Sud Ladies Cup and the 2020 CONCACAF Women's U-20 Championship. She made her senior debut on 13 June 2021 as an 84th-minute substitution in a 1–5 friendly away loss to Japan.

References

2001 births
Living people
Footballers from Mexico City
Mexican women's footballers
Women's association football forwards
Mexico women's international footballers
Mexican emigrants to the United States
Naturalized citizens of the United States
People from Hacienda Heights, California
Sportspeople from Los Angeles County, California
Soccer players from California
American women's soccer players
Saint Mary's Gaels women's soccer players
American sportspeople of Mexican descent
Mexican footballers